Imbricaria zetema previously known as Subcancilla zetema is a species of sea snail, a marine gastropoda mollusc in the family Mitridae.

Description
The length of the shell varies between 19 mm and 40 mm.

Original description
 Dekkers A.M., Herrmann M., Poppe G.T. & Tagaro S.P. (2014) Three new species of Subcancilla from the Pacific Ocean (Gastropoda: Mitridae). Visaya 4(2): 39-48. [May 2014] page(s): 43.

Distribution
This marine species occurs off the Philippines; North Borneo and Papua New Guinea.

References

External links
 Worms Link
 Fedosov A., Puillandre N., Herrmann M., Kantor Yu., Oliverio M., Dgebuadze P., Modica M.V. & Bouchet P. (2018). The collapse of Mitra: molecular systematics and morphology of the Mitridae (Gastropoda: Neogastropoda). Zoological Journal of the Linnean Society. 183(2): 253-337

Mitridae
Gastropods described in 2014